Monte Rosso (Colli Euganei) is a mountain of the Veneto, Italy. It has an elevation of 174 metres.

Mountains of Veneto